Craig Tomlinson (born 31 October 1972 in Westmoreland) is a former Jamaican footballer.

Career

College and amateur
Tomlinson began his collegiate soccer career at Fresno State University before transferring to Ohio State University for the 1998 season. In 1997 and 1998, Tomlinson spent the collegiate off-season with the Central Coast Roadrunners of the Premier Development League.

Professional
Tomlinson turned professional in 1999 when he joined the Tennessee Rhythm of the USL A-League. That fall, he signed with the Wichita Wings of the National Professional Soccer League In 2000, he signed with the Seattle Sounders of the USL First Division.  While he was a consistent starter, he lost most of the 2002 season and the entire 2005 season after tearing his anterior cruciate ligament in preseason. He retired at the conclusion of the 2008 season, having played 119 league games and scored 10 goals for the Sounders over the course of 8 seasons.

Tomlinson returned to the field with the announcement on 18 March 2011 that he signed with North Sound SeaWolves in the American fourth tier USL Premier Development League.

Honors

Seattle Sounders
USL First Division Championship (1): 2007

References

External links
 2007 Seattle Sounders Media Guide

1972 births
Living people
Jamaican footballers
Jamaican expatriate footballers
Fresno State Bulldogs men's soccer players
Ohio State Buckeyes men's soccer players
Central Coast Roadrunners players
Tennessee Rhythm players
Seattle Sounders (1994–2008) players
Puget Sound Gunners FC players
National Professional Soccer League (1984–2001) players
Wichita Wings (NPSL) players
A-League (1995–2004) players
USL First Division players
USL League Two players
Sportspeople from Kingston, Jamaica
Ohio State University alumni
Expatriate soccer players in the United States
Association football forwards